Opalia ahiparana is a species of very small deepwater sea snail, a marine gastropod mollusk in the family Epitoniidae, the wentletraps.

Distribution
This marine species is endemic to New Zealand.

References

 Powell A.W.B. (1930) New species of New Zealand Mollusca from shallow-water dredgings. Part 1. Transactions and Proceedings of the Royal Society of New Zealand 60: 532-543. page(s): 541
 Powell A. W. B., New Zealand Mollusca, William Collins Publishers Ltd, Auckland, New Zealand 1979 

Epitoniidae
Gastropods of New Zealand
Gastropods described in 1930
Taxa named by Arthur William Baden Powell
Endemic fauna of New Zealand
Endemic molluscs of New Zealand